Elise Mertens and Aryna Sabalenka were the defending champions, but chose not to participate.

Sania Mirza and Zhang Shuai won the title, defeating Kaitlyn Christian and Erin Routliffe in the final, 6–3, 6–2.

Seeds

Draw

Draw

References

External links
Main Draw

JandT Banka Ostrava Open - Doubles
2021 Doubles